James Aylward (born January 12, 1964) is a Canadian politician, who was elected to the Legislative Assembly of Prince Edward Island in the 2011 provincial election. He represents the district of Stratford-Keppoch as a member of the Prince Edward Island Progressive Conservative Party. He served as the Leader of the Opposition and leader of the Progressive Conservative party from October 2017 to February 2019.

In December 2014, Aylward announced his candidacy in the 2015 Progressive Conservative Party of Prince Edward Island leadership election. He lost to Rob Lantz on the second ballot, at the PC leadership convention on February 28, 2015.

Aylward won the leadership of the Progressive Conservative Party in 2017, defeating fellow MLA Brad Trivers.

On September 17, 2018 Aylward announced his pending resignation as party leader, effective upon the selection of his successor at the 2019 party leadership convention.

Electoral record

References

External links
 James Aylward

Living people
1964 births
Members of the Executive Council of Prince Edward Island
People from Queens County, Prince Edward Island
Progressive Conservative Party of Prince Edward Island MLAs
21st-century Canadian politicians